Richard Berens (28 January 1864 – 14 July 1909) was an English cricketer and barrister.

Berens was educated at Westminster School and Christ Church, Oxford, and qualified as a barrister at the Inner Temple in 1892.

A club cricketer, he was invited to take part in two tours by English amateurs to the West Indies in 1894-95 and 1896-97 and one to North America in 1898. He played all of his first-class cricket career on these tours. He was a batsman, but his contributions were modest: the 37 and 50 he scored in the second match against Barbados on the first tour were the only innings in which he reached 25.

He married Elizabeth Evelyn Gibbons on 3 December 1900.

References

External links

1864 births
1909 deaths
People educated at Westminster School, London
Alumni of Christ Church, Oxford
English barristers
English cricketers
Lord Hawke's XI cricketers
R. S. Lucas' XI cricketers
P. F. Warner's XI cricketers
Members of the Inner Temple
19th-century English lawyers